Garrett Deforest Kinney (May 21, 1869 – August 7, 1933) was an American politician and businessman.

Born in Rensselaer County, New York, Kinney moved with his parents to Peoria, Illinois in 1874. Kinney went to the Peoria Public Schools and to Cornell University. He was involved in the manufacturing business and was also involved with banking. He was president of Culter & Proctor Stove Company and Metal Barrel Corporation. He was involved with the Republican. Kinney served as Illinois State Treasurer from 1927 to 1929. Kinney died in Peoria, Illinois on August 7, 1933, after shooting himself on June 23, 1933. Kinney was being investigated for taking Illinois state monies while director of Illinois State Finances under Governor Louis Lincoln Emmerson.

Notes

External links

1869 births
1933 deaths
Politicians from Peoria, Illinois
People from Rensselaer County, New York
Cornell University alumni
Businesspeople from Illinois
Illinois Republicans
State treasurers of Illinois
Suicides by firearm in Illinois
American politicians who committed suicide
1933 suicides